The 1963 SCCA National Sports Car Championship season was the thirteenth season of the Sports Car Club of America's National Sports Car Championship. It began April 7, 1963, and ended September 2, 1963, after ten races.

Schedule

 Feature race

Season results
Feature race overall winners in bold.

 D and E Modified were classified with C Modified at Meadowdale.

Champions

References

External links
World Sports Racing Prototypes: SCCA 1963
Racing Sports Cars: SCCA archive

SCCA National Sports Car Championship
Scca National Sports Car Championship
 
1963 in American motorsport